Huangbian Station, called Shanglinzhen Station during planning, is a metro station on Line 2 of the Guangzhou Metro. It is located at the underground of the south of Huangbian North Road in the Baiyun District of Guangzhou. The station started operation on 25September, 2010.

References

Railway stations in China opened in 2010
Guangzhou Metro stations in Baiyun District